Neil McKendrick MA FRHistS (born 28 July 1935) was the 40th Master of Gonville and Caius College, Cambridge. He is now a life fellow of the college.

McKendrick was educated at Alderman Newton's School, Leicester, and Christ's College, Cambridge, where he won an Entrance Scholarship. He is an Emeritus Reader in History having taught Modern English Social and Economic History as well as Business, Literature and Society, 1690–1990. He is also a fellow of the Royal Historical Society. During his time at the college he was successively Lecturer in History, Director of Studies in History, Graduate Tutor and Master.

McKendrick was Chairman of the college committee which presided over the plans for the Cockerell Building, now the College Library, the Auditorium, and the public rooms in Gonville Court, directed by neo-classical architect John Simpson. More recently, he was even more deeply involved in their completion and their formal openings by the Duke of Edinburgh and the Prince of Wales – and in the refurbishment of the Master's Lodge, also John Simpson's work.

Also under the Mastership of Neil McKendrick the College embarked on a fundraising appeal to support the construction of a new accommodation building, the Stephen Hawking Building, on the college's West Road site.

He featured in Pseuds Corner of the Private Eye:

McKendrick is the namesake of the Neil McKendrick Lectureship in History at Gonville and Caius College, University of Cambridge, currently held by Dr Melissa Calaresu.

Offices held

Publications
 McKendrick, N., 1982. 'The Commercialization of Fashion' in The Birth of a Consumer Society: The Commercialization of Eighteenth-Century England edited by Neil McKendrick, John Brewer and J.H. Plumb. London: Europa Publications Limited
 McKendrick, N., 1970. "Josiah Wedgwood and Cost Accounting in the Industrial Revolution". The Economic History Review. Vol. 23, No. 1, pp. 45–67.  
 McKendrick, N., 1964. "Josiah Wedgwood and Thomas Bentley: An Inventor-Entrepreneur Partnership in the Industrial Revolution". Transactions of the Royal Historical Society (Fifth Series). Vol. 14,pp. 1–33. 
 McKendrick, N., 1961. "Josiah Wedgwood and Factory Discipline". The Historical Journal. Vol. 4, No. 1, pp. 30–55.
 McKendrick, N., 1957. "Josiah Wedgwood and George Stubbs". History Today. Vol. 7, Issue 8.

References

1935 births
20th-century British historians
Alumni of Christ's College, Cambridge
Economic historians
Fellows of Gonville and Caius College, Cambridge
Fellows of the Royal Historical Society
Masters of Gonville and Caius College, Cambridge
Social historians
Living people